Will Donato is a smooth jazz composer, alto saxophonist and recording artist whose 2007 release, Will Call is his first with Innervision Records. His "Infinite Soul" reached No. 1 on the Billboard Smooth Jazz Airplay chart in 2019. His "You Got This" was No. 31 on the Billboard Smooth Jazz Songs year-end chart of 2020.

Discography 
Laws Of Attraction - 2009
Will Call - 2007
Will Power - 2004 (on Generation Records)
Portrait (with the Art of Sax) - 2002
The Art of Sax
Speak My Heart

References

External links 
Official Will Donato website
May 2005 review of Will Power at Smoothviews.com
February 2007 review of Will Call at Smoothviews.com
Showcase of Will Power at Jazzlynx.net

Smooth jazz saxophonists
Living people
American male saxophonists
21st-century American saxophonists
21st-century American male musicians
American male jazz musicians
Year of birth missing (living people)